The Federal League is an Ohio High School Athletic Association (OHSAA) sports conference that was established in 1964 and includes schools from Stark and Summit counties.

Current members

Former members
 Austintown-Fitch Falcons (2003–2011)
 Alliance Aviators (1983–2003)
 Boardman Spartans (2003–2013)
 Fairless Falcons (1964–1975)
 Glenwood Eagles (1964–1975)
 Louisville Leopards (1968–1990)
 Marlington Dukes (1964–1985)
 New Philadelphia Quakers (1988–1997)
 Oakwood Golden Raiders (1968–1975)
 Sandy Valley Cardinals (1964–1968)
 Canton South Wildcats (1964–1990)
 Canton Timken Trojans (1988–1995)
 Wooster Generals (1988–2003)

League history

1960s
 The Federal League begins league play in 1964 with Canton South, Fairless, Glenwood, Jackson, Marlington, Perry, and Sandy Valley as charter members.
 In 1968, Sandy Valley leaves the league and is replaced by Louisville, North Canton Hoover, and Oakwood.

1970s
 In 1975, Fairless leaves the league while Glenwood and Oakwood consolidate to form GlenOak.

1980s
 In 1983, Alliance joins the league.
 In 1985, Marlington leaves the league.
 In 1987, Lake joins the league.
 In 1988, New Philadelphia, Canton Timken, and Wooster join the league, prompting the league to split into an American Division and a National Division:

1990s
 In 1990, Canton South and Louisville leave for the Northeastern Buckeye Conference (NBC), which causes the divisional format to be dropped.
 In 1995, Timken leaves the league.
 In 1997, New Philadelphia leaves for the East Central Ohio League.

2000s
 In 2003, Alliance and Wooster leave for the Metro Athletic Conference and the newly formed Ohio Cardinal Conference, respectively. Alliance would move again to the NBC in 2005.
 At the same time, Austintown-Fitch, Boardman, and Canton McKinley join in all sports except for football, which they would fully join in the following school year.

2010s
 In 2011, Austintown-Fitch left the Federal League for the All-American Conference for all sports except football.  They had hoped to remain a football-only member of the Federal League, but that did not work out. They replaced Salem, who left for the NBC.
 In 2013, Boardman announced that they are looking to leave for the All-American Conference.
 In 2013, Green announced that they would join the Federal League for 2015-16.
 In February 2017, former member Louisville's school board submitted a letter of interest to the Federal League, then withdrew it shortly after.  However, in March 2017 they renewed their recommendation that they seek membership in the Federal League after it became evident that it would be difficult for Louisville to schedule sporting events as a league independent.  Louisville's league at the time, the Northeastern Buckeye Conference, folded after the 2017-2018 school year, which left the Leopards without a league home.

League champions

League champions

See also
Ohio High School Athletic Conferences

References
 The Federal League Football History

Ohio high school sports conferences